Clerow "Flip" Wilson Jr. (December 8, 1933 – November 25, 1998) was an American comedian and actor best known for his television appearances during the late 1960s and 1970s. From 1970 to 1974, Wilson hosted his own weekly variety series The Flip Wilson Show, and introduced viewers to his recurring character Geraldine. The series earned Wilson a Golden Globe and two Emmy Awards, and it was the second highest-rated show on network television for a time. Wilson was the first African American to host a successful TV variety show. In January 1972, Time magazine featured Wilson's image on its cover and named him "TV's first black superstar". He released a number of comedy albums in the 1960s and 1970s and won a Grammy Award for his 1970 album The Devil Made Me Buy This Dress.

Wilson kept performing and acting until the 1990s, though at a reduced schedule, up until his death from cancer in 1998. He hosted a short-lived revival of People Are Funny in 1984, and he had the lead role in the 1985–1986 sitcom Charlie & Co.

Early life
Born Clerow Wilson Jr. in Jersey City, New Jersey, he was one of ten children born to Cornelia Bullock and Clerow Wilson Sr. His father worked as a handyman but, because of the Great Depression, was often out of work. When Wilson was seven years old, his mother abandoned the family. His father was unable to care for the children alone and he placed many of them in foster homes.

After bouncing from foster homes to reform school, sixteen-year-old Wilson lied about his age and joined the United States Air Force. His outgoing personality and funny stories made him popular; he was even asked to tour military bases to cheer up other servicemen. Claiming that he was always "flipped out", Wilson's barracks mates gave him the nickname "Flip", which he used as his stage name.

Discharged from the Air Force in 1954, Wilson started working as a bellhop in San Francisco's Manor Plaza Hotel. At the Plaza's nightclub, Wilson found extra work playing a drunken patron between regularly scheduled acts. His inebriated character proved popular and Wilson began performing it in clubs throughout California. At first Wilson would simply ad-lib onstage, but eventually he added written material and his act became more sophisticated.

Career
In the late 1950s and early 1960s, Wilson toured regularly through nightclubs with a black clientele in the so-called "Chitlin' Circuit". During the 1960s, Wilson became a regular at the Apollo Theater in Harlem. An unexpected break came in 1965, when comedian Redd Foxx was a guest on The Tonight Show and host Johnny Carson asked him who the funniest comedian at the time was; Foxx answered, "Flip Wilson". Carson then booked Wilson to appear on The Tonight Show and Wilson became a favorite guest on that show as well as on The Ed Sullivan Show. Wilson later singled out Sullivan as providing his biggest career boost. Wilson also made guest appearances on numerous TV comedies and variety shows, such as Here's Lucy (in which he played the role of "Prissy" in a spoof of Gone with the Wind with Lucille Ball as Scarlett), Laugh-In, and The Dean Martin Show, among others.

Wilson's warm and ebullient personality was infectious. Richard Pryor told Wilson, "You're the only performer that I've ever seen who goes on the stage and the audience hopes that you like them."

A routine titled "Columbus", from the 1967 album Cowboys and Colored People, brought Wilson to Hollywood industry attention. In this bit, Wilson retells the story of Christopher Columbus from an anachronistic urbanized viewpoint in which Columbus convinces the Spanish monarchs to fund his voyage by noting that discovering America means that he can also discover Ray Charles. Hearing this, Queen "Isabel Johnson", whose voice is an early version of Wilson's eventual "Geraldine" character, says that "Chris" can have "all the money you want, honey – You go find Ray Charles!"  When Columbus departs from the dock, an inebriated Isabella is there, testifying to one and all that "Chris gonna find Ray Charles!"

In 1970, Wilson won a Grammy Award for his comedy album The Devil Made Me Buy This Dress. He was also a regular cast member on Rowan & Martin's Laugh-In. DePatie-Freleng Enterprises featured Wilson in two animated TV specials, Clerow Wilson and the Miracle of P.S. 14 and Clerow Wilson's Great Escape.

The Flip Wilson Show

In 1970, Wilson's variety series, The Flip Wilson Show, debuted on NBC. He performed in comedy sketches and played host to many African-American entertainers, including Lena Horne, Harry Belafonte, Diahann Carroll, the Supremes, the Jackson Five, Aretha Franklin, the Temptations, Gladys Knight & the Pips, Redd Foxx, boxer Muhammad Ali and basketball player Bill Russell. He greeted all his guests with the "Flip Wilson Handshake": four hand slaps, two elbow bumps, finishing with two hip-bumps. George Carlin was one of the show's writers, and Carlin also made frequent appearances on the show, as the two would expand Carlin's news-weather-sports satire. Wilson's characters included Reverend Leroy, the materialistic pastor of the "Church of What’s Happening Now", and his most popular character, Geraldine Jones, who frequently referred to her unseen boyfriend, "Killer", and whose lines "The devil made me do it" as well as "What you see is what you get" became national catchphrases.

The Flip Wilson Show aired through 1974, generating high ratings and popularity among viewers and winning strong critical acclaim, with eleven Emmy Award nominations during its run, winning two. Wilson also won a Golden Globe Award for Best Actor in a Television Series.

Later years
Wilson acted in TV and theatrical movies, including Uptown Saturday Night and The Fish that Saved Pittsburgh. In 1976, he appeared as the Fox in a television musical adaptation of Pinocchio, starring Sandy Duncan in the title role and Danny Kaye as Geppetto, with songs by Laugh-In composer Billy Barnes. In 1981 he made a guest appearance on The Love Boat.

During March–July 1984, Wilson hosted a revival of People are Funny. In 1985–1986, Wilson played the lead role in the CBS sitcom Charlie & Co. Two of his last TV appearances were cameos on the sitcoms Living Single in 1993, and The Drew Carey Show in 1996.

Personal life
Wilson was married twice. In 1957, he married Lavenia Patricia "Peaches" Wilson (née Dean); they divorced in 1967. He had four children with his common-law wife Blonell Pitman. After winning custody of his children in 1979, Wilson performed less in order to spend more time with them. In 1979, he married Tuanchai "Cookie" MacKenzie, with whom he had one child; they divorced in 1984.

In March 1981, Wilson was arrested and charged with possession of a small quantity of cocaine.

Death 
On November 25, 1998, Wilson died from liver cancer in Malibu, California, 2 weeks before his 65th birthday. He was cremated at Westwood Village Memorial Park Cemetery and his ashes were scattered off Malibu Beach.

Discography
 1961 — Flippin''' (Minit)
 1964 — Flip Wilson's Pot Luck (Scepter, reissued as Funny and Live at the Village Gate, Springboard)
 1967 — Cowboys and Colored People (Atlantic)
 1968 — You Devil You (Atlantic)
 1970 — The Devil Made Me Buy This Dress (Little David)
 1970 — The Flip Wilson Show (Little David)
 1970 — Flipped Out (Sunset Records)
 1972 — Geraldine'' (Little David)

In popular culture
Wilson popularized the phrase "The devil made me do it." The catchphrase "What you see is what you get," often used by Wilson's Geraldine character, inspired researchers at PARC (and elsewhere) to create the acronym WYSIWYG for computer software.

Footnotes

References

Bibliography

External links

 
 
 
 

1933 births
1998 deaths
20th-century American male actors
African-American male actors
African-American male comedians
American male comedians
American male film actors
American male television actors
American stand-up comedians
American television personalities
American television writers
Best Musical or Comedy Actor Golden Globe (television) winners
Emmy Award winners
Grammy Award winners
Male actors from Jersey City, New Jersey
American male television writers
United States Air Force airmen
20th-century American comedians
Screenwriters from New Jersey
Minit Records artists
20th-century American screenwriters
Deaths from cancer in California
Deaths from liver cancer
20th-century American male writers
20th-century African-American writers
African-American male writers